Courtney Adams (born June 5, 1981 in Houston, Texas) is an artist based in Hamburg, Germany. His style is flat, but a multi-dimensional style of painting called “Cubo-Expressionistic Primitivism” ( a mixture of French Cubism, German Expressionism and African Primitivism), in which he filed a copyright with the Library of Congress in the United States of America in 2002. His works are usually done in acrylic paint to produce a “factory made” look. After being discovered by famous Polish singer Aneta Barcik at a winter concert in Houston, Texas in 2010 (the year of Frédéric Chopin's bicentenary), Adams was chosen to become the art director for “Chopin 200th” a multi-media festival created by Barcik. The festival toured around Europe, most notably at the Eigenarten Festival in Germany. In 2011, Houston based magazine "River oaks/Tanglewood Buzz" did a short segment about Adams winter exhibition in Germany and London, as well as his first masterclass taught in London at the Loft at Crouch End. In June, he was nominated as the first "Polen Freund" (translated in English as the First Friend of Poland) in the 1st Polish Festival in Hamburg, Germany which took place at Museum für Völkerkunde. This honored allowed him as the first non-Polish artist to exhibit his work at the Festival at the museum. Courtney was featured in a news segment called "Kultur Tip" on the Hamburg Journal TV program in June, 2011. In April 2012,Adams also became the first and only American Artist inducted into The Magma Group, an artist exhibition group based in South East London, curated by artist Annie Zamero. In November 2012, Courtney Adams signed a two-year art distribution deal with Uk-based company LatestSale and has since left the Magma Group.

Music career
Adams is also a musician and professional songwriter affiliated with SESAC under Courtney Adams Music Publishing. He has scored several jingles for TV infomercials through Florida based company, Sullivan Productions for such products as the Zanshu Knife, Wacky Pens and Green Caps. Adams is currently working on several musical projects in Long Beach, California. Since 2009, Adams has been a member of the Marshall Arts Music Production House song writing team, led by Marshall Goodman "Ras MG", and has participated in song writing for artists including Slightly Stoopid, Rebelution, and LBDA. Adams and Goodman have written a multitude of songs for Adams' solo project named Clavious. The duo plans to extend their body of work by developing Adams' Rock Band concept Element 115 in the near future.

Discography 

2015
Rebelution (band) - Count Me In EP  "De-Stress"
Slightly Stoopid - Meanwhile...Back at the Lab "The Prophet"

References

External links
Official Art of Courtney Page
Hip Hop Streets "Talent that Lives Outside of the Internet"
The Pier Magazine- Roots of Creation "Struggle" RAS MG remix
 Yahoo Hear it First "Meanwhile Back at the Lab"
 The Pier Magazine
Courtney Adams Official site
Chopin 200th Exhibition Germany
Chopin 200th Eigenarten Festival October 28 – November 7, 2010 Germany
Chopin 200th Eigenarten Festival October 28 – November 7, 2010 Germany
Teraz Polonia Delphi Showpalast Exhibition Chopin 200th Germany September 25, 2010
Courtney Adams and Chopin Article, published by Rynek Magazine, Hamburg, Germany October 2010 http://www.rynek.de/
 Chopin and Poland Concert January 2, 2011 at the Loft, Crouch End in London, UK
Winter Concert January,2010 Houston,TX
Teraz Polonia TV Interview with Polish singer, Aneta Barcik Germany

1981 births
Living people
Atlanta College of Art alumni
20th-century American painters
American male painters
21st-century American painters
Artists from Houston
American expatriates in Germany
20th-century American male artists